Pilosocereus chrysostele is a species of Pilosocereus found in Brazil

Subspecies
 Pilosocereus chrysostele subsp. catimbauensis 
 Pilosocereus chrysostele subsp. chrysostele

References

External links

chrysostele